This is a list of properties and districts in New Mexico that are on the National Register of Historic Places. There are more than 1,100 listings. Of these, 46 are National Historic Landmarks. There are listings in each of the state's 33 counties.

The tables linked below are intended to provide a complete list of properties and districts listed in each county.  The locations of National Register properties and districts with latitude and longitude data may be seen in an online map by clicking on "Map of all coordinates".

The names on the lists are as they were entered into the National Register; some place names are uncommon or have changed since being added to the National Register.



Current listings by county

See also

List of National Historic Landmarks in New Mexico
List of bridges on the National Register of Historic Places in New Mexico
New Mexico State Register of Cultural Properties

References

 
New Mexico